The Southern Association of Minor League Baseball was a baseball league that operated in the United States from 1901 to 1961. A league champion was determined at the end of each season. Champions were determined by postseason playoffs or winning the regular season pennant.

With 18 pennant wins, the Atlanta Crackers won the most regular season pennants in the history of the Southern Association. They are followed by the New Orleans Pelicans (9); Birmingham Barons, Memphis Egyptians/Chicks, and Nashville Baseball Club/Vols (8); Chattanooga Lookouts and Little Rock Travelers (4); and Mobile Bears (2).

The Nashville Vols have the most playoff championships, with nine. They are followed by the Atlanta Crackers (6); Birmingham Barons (5); Mobile Bears (4); New Orleans Pelicans (3); Little Rock Travelers (2); and Memphis Chicks (1).

Considering all championships, both pennants and playoffs, the Atlanta Crackers (24) have the most in league history. They are followed by the Nashville Baseball Club/Vols (17); Birmingham Barons (13); New Orleans Pelicans (12); Memphis Egyptians/Chicks (9); Little Rock Travelers and Mobile Bears (6); and Chattanooga Lookouts (4).

History
League champions were determined by different means throughout the Southern Associations's existence. Champions from 1901 to 1927 and from 1929 to 1931 were simply the regular season pennant winners. In 1928 and from 1932, either the top two or four teams in the league competed in playoffs to determine a league champion. These playoffs varied between being best-of-five and best-of-seven contests.

Pennant winners

Playoff champions
Scores and runner-up teams are absent when no playoffs were held or pennant winners were declared champions.

Championship wins by club

Pennants

Playoffs

See also

U.S. minor league baseball awards

Notes

References
Specific

General

Southern Association
Southern Association
Southern Association champions
Southern Association